was a Japanese metallurgist and inventor. He discovered that aluminum restored magnetism to non-magnetic nickel steel. He invented MKM steel, which was an extremely inexpensive magnetic substance that has been used in many applications. It is also closely related to the modern Alnico magnets. He later became a professor at the Tokyo Imperial University. After his death, his remains were buried in the Tama Cemetery in Tokyo.

Honours
Award of the Imperial Academy (1945)
Order of Culture (1950)
Medal of Honor with Blue Ribbon (1950)
Grand Cordon of the Order of the Rising Sun (19 November 1975; posthumous)

On April 18, 1985, the Japan Patent Office selected him as one of Ten Japanese Great Inventors.

References

External links
 http://www.freepatentsonline.com/2027997.pdf
 http://www.jpo.go.jp/seido_e/rekishi_e/tokushi_mishima.htm

1893 births
1975 deaths
20th-century Japanese inventors
Japanese metallurgists
Laureates of the Imperial Prize